Dick Lowry (born 15 September 1944 in Oklahoma) is an American director and film producer.

Productions
List films were all made for television unless otherwise indicated.

1975: The Drought (theatrical film)
1980: OHMS
1980: Kenny Rogers as The Gambler
1980: The Jayne Mansfield Story
1981: Angel Dusted
1981: Coward of the County
1981: A Few Days in Weasel Creek
1982: Rascals and Robbers: The Secret Adventures of Tom Sawyer and Huckleberry Finn
1982: Missing Children: A Mother's Story
1983: Living Proof: The Hank Williams Jr. Story
1983: Smokey and the Bandit Part 3 (theatrical film; also actor, as Sand Dumper)
1983: Kenny Rogers as The Gambler: The Adventure Continues
1984: Pigs vs. Freaks
1984: Wet Gold
1984: The Toughest Man in the World
1985: Murder with Mirrors
1985: Wild Horses
1986: Dream West (three-part miniseries)
1987: American Harvest
1987: Kenny Rogers as The Gambler, Part III: The Legend Continues
1988: Case Closed
1988: In the Line of Duty: The F.B.I. Murders
1989: Unconquered
1989: Howard Beach: Making a Case for Murder
1990: Miracle Landing
1990: Archie: To Riverdale and Back Again
1990: In the Line of Duty: A Cop for the Killing
1991: In the Line of Duty: Manhunt in the Dakotas
1991: The Gambler Returns: The Luck of the Draw
1992: A Woman Scorned: The Betty Broderick Story
1992: In the Line of Duty: Street War
1992: Skin (short film)
1992: Her Final Fury: Betty Broderick, the Last Chapter
1993: In the Line of Duty: Ambush in Waco
1994: In the Line of Duty: The Price of Vengeance
1994: One More Mountain
1995: Texas Justice
1995: A Horse for Danny
1995: In the Line of Duty: Hunt for Justice
1996: In the Line of Duty: Smoke Jumpers
1996: Project: ALF
1996: Forgotten Sins
1997: In the Line of Duty: Blaze of Glory
1997: Last Stand at Saber River
1997: Two Came Back
1998: Mr. Murder (two-part miniseries)
1999: Atomic Train (two-part miniseries)
1999: A Murder on Shadow Mountain
1999: Y2K
2001: Attila (two-part miniseries)
2001: Follow the Stars Home
2001: The Diamond of Jeru
2001: Little John
2002: Heart of a Stranger
2004: Category 6: Day of Destruction (two-part miniseries)
2005: Category 7: The End of the World (two-part miniseries)
2005: Silver Bells
2011: Jesse Stone: Innocents Lost

References

External links
 

1944 births
Living people
American film directors
American film producers
American television directors